Wasted Talent is the sixth studio album by American rapper Jim Jones. It was released on April 13, 2018 via Vamplife and EMPIRE Distribution.

Critical reception

Trent Clark of HipHopDX rated the album a 3.8 out of 5 stars, calling the album a "CPR for traditional NYC rap", also praising the body of work for its nolstagia-filled content by saying "...They don't make New York rappers like they used to and hearing Jones dominate a full-length project with accelerated lyricism is a throwback to the days of the American Diplomatic flag".

On May 14, 2018, while being interviewed on The Howard Stern Show, former Wack Pack member King Of All Blacks called the album the greatest hip-hop record of the past 15 years.

Track listing 

Sample credits
Track 3 contains elements from "Hurry Up This Way Again" performed by The Stylistics
Track 9 contains elements from "All the Way Around" performed by Marvin Gaye

Charts

References

External links
 Wasted Talent by Jim Jones on iTunes
 Jim Jones - Wasted Talent at Discogs

2018 albums
Jim Jones (rapper) albums
Albums produced by Jahlil Beats
Empire Distribution albums